David G. Bellon is a United States Marine Corps lieutenant general who serves as the Commander of the United States Marine Corps Reserve and Marine Corps Forces, South. He previously commanded Marine Forces South from May 2017 to August 2018, ceding control to Major General Michael F. Fahey III.

Bellon assumed command of Marine Forces Reserve from interim commander Brigadier General Michael S. Martin in September after taking over as Interim from LtGen Michael A. Rocco, USMC, upcoming retirement after over 37 years of service. In 2017, Rocco was promoted to Lieutenant General and assumed the duties of Deputy Commandant for Manpower and Reserve Affairs.

References

Living people
Place of birth missing (living people)
Recipients of the Defense Superior Service Medal
Recipients of the Legion of Merit
United States Marine Corps generals
United States Marine Corps personnel of the Gulf War
United States Marine Corps personnel of the War in Afghanistan (2001–2021)
Year of birth missing (living people)